The Bentley Bentayga is a mid-size luxury crossover SUV produced by Bentley Motors since late 2015. It is brand's first production SUV (ignoring the 6 special Dominators built for the Sultan of Brunei in the 1990s).
Its body is manufactured at the Volkswagen Zwickau-Mosel Plant in Germany, then painted and assembled at Bentley Motor's factory in Crewe, United Kingdom.

Concept car 

Bentley's first SUV was previewed as the Bentley EXP 9 F concept car at the 2012 Geneva Motor Show. The concept car was based upon the Volkswagen Group MLB platform, powered by a 6.0 L W12 engine producing . The initial design of the EXP 9 F was redesigned to achieve "more traditional SUV proportions and less retro surfacing."

The production version was announced in July 2013. The Bentley EXP 9 F's design proved to be controversial, and it received a mixed response from the automobile press. After some criticism for the design of the EXP 9 F, Bentley announced that it would change the styling for the production versions.

Overview

The production Bentayga debuted at the Frankfurt Motor Show in September 2015 as Bentley's first SUV – using unibody construction and full-time all-wheel drive as well as Volkswagen Group's bi-turbo W12 engine and MLB platform, the latter shared with the second-generation Audi Q7 and the third-generation Porsche Cayenne, Audi Q8, and Lamborghini Urus.

Available in seating configurations for four, five, or seven, at launch the Bentayga was claimed by the manufacturer as the SUV which has the highest top speed  as well as the second most expensive production SUV.

A total of 608 "First Edition" units (featuring the 608PS W12) were manufactured upon introduction.

The original prediction for 2016 was that 3,500 Bentaygas would be sold. When the entire production volume for the year sold out in advance, production was increased and resulted in 5,586 units being sold.

Despite its high price tag, the car was a sales success for Bentley in 2016 and became Bentley's most popular model. It has contributed to Bentley's increasing sales as of 2022.

Bentley revealed the name Bentayga in January 2015. The name comes from Roque Bentayga, an emblematic highland rock situated in Tejeda, Gran Canaria, the subtropical Canary Island. The company also drew inspiration from a portmanteau of Bentley and Taiga, the world's largest transcontinental snow forest, composed of the first four letters of Bentley and an altered spelling of taiga. An early name for the model was the Falcon.

Assembly 
Originally slated by Volkswagen to be produced at the Volkswagen Bratislava Plant in Slovakia where all other models based on the platform are produced, an agreement was reached with the British Government for the model to be produced at the Crewe factory. Bentley invested £800 million in a new assembly facility in Crewe and employed 1,000 new employees to support production of the new model.

Although assembly of the Bentayga was moved to Crewe, initially production of the Bentayga's body shell remained at the Bratislava facility. Body shell production was moved to Volkswagen's Zwickau-Mosel Plant at the end of 2016.

Powertrains

W12

The 2016 Bentayga was launched with (and was first to receive) Bentley's new twin-turbo W12 engine. The engine was fitted with variable displacement technology and could deactivate 6 of the engine's 12 cylinders if needed.

A second, more powerful version of the twin-turbo W12 was introduced for the Bentayga Speed in 2020 helping the car to achieve a claimed  of 3.9 s.

Diesel
Starting in 2017, a diesel V8 derived from the VW Group diesel V8 was available. This engine is Bentley's first diesel and only offered in the Bentayga. Included are a badge on the front wing and the trapezoid quad exhaust tips.

V8
A V8 engine became available in 2018.

Hybrid

A plug-in hybrid model was revealed at the 2018 Geneva Motor Show and went on sale in the UK, Europe, and North America in October 2019.

Engines

2020 facelift

The facelifted model was released in June 2020. Changes include new 3D elliptical tail-lights with animated LEDs, similar to those on the third-generation Continental GT, and a rear number plate repositioned onto the bumper to allow for ‘Bentley’ to be spelled out across the tailgate. The rear spoiler was enlarged. New side vents, a new  wheel design, and two paint colours were added. New oval-shaped split tailpipes, heated wipers with 22 washer jets in each arm, and an optional Blackline variant with blacked-out chrome complete the external alterations.

Changes were in the cabin, such as in the rear, where new seat frames in combination with extra reclining allow a  increase in knee space. There are ventilated rear seats and the car can be had with four, five, or seven seats. Rear passengers also receive an updated 5.0-in removable touchscreen tablet to control entertainment and comfort functions.

The infotainment has a new system with a higher resolution 10.9-in touchscreen. Included are Apple CarPlay and Android Auto as well as USB-C ports, air ionisers, wireless smartphone charging, and an embedded SIM card for data services. The traditional instrument dials have been replaced with a digital display (like in newer Bentleys) and the head-up display shows much more data. The audio system is a 790W, 12-speaker stereo with an optional Naim system that has 1780W and 20 speakers.

The optional W12 engine is no longer available for the 2020 model. The base model features a 4.0 L twin-turbocharged V8 engine generating . Optional is the V6 plug-in hybrid which will come to the market by late 2020. A new Bentayga Speed was introduced in August 2020. It shares the same 6.0 L Twin-turbocharged W12 engine with the older Bentayga Speed which generates .

2022 Bentley Bentayga S 

In 2022, Bentley has announced details of the new Bentayga S, providing sportier agility.

Mulliner
Mulliner is Bentley's internal customisation company, which creates limited-edition options and accessories. Customers are able to customise the cars including custom paint and colours as well as interior hide and carpet colours. An option is the Mulliner Tourbillon dashboard clock designed by Swiss watchmaker Breitling. The clock spins 3 times every 15 minutes.

2023 Bentley Bentayga EWB
In May 2022, the Bentley Bentayga Extended Wheelbase, intended to replace the Bentley Mulsanne, was released. It features a V8 twin-turbo 4.0-litre engine that produces , active anti-roll bars, and rear wheel steering.

Recall
Some seats had not been secured properly during assembly, and Bentley issued a recall for 378 cars in November 2016.

References

External links

 
 Bentley Bentayga at Pikes Peak at Official Bentley channel on YouTube

Bentayga
Cars introduced in 2015
2020s cars
Mid-size sport utility vehicles
Luxury crossover sport utility vehicles
All-wheel-drive vehicles
Hybrid electric cars
Plug-in hybrid vehicles
Expanded length sport utility vehicles